Eulepidotis striaepuncta is a moth of the family Erebidae first described by Gottlieb August Wilhelm Herrich-Schäffer in 1868. It is found in the Neotropics, including Cuba and Puerto Rico.

References

Moths described in 1868
striaepuncta